Adel Fadaaq (Arabic:عادل فدعق) (born 12 September 1992) is an Emirati footballer. He currently plays for Al-Nasr.

External links

References

Emirati footballers
1992 births
Living people
Al Wahda FC players
Baniyas Club players
Al Jazira Club players
Al-Nasr SC (Dubai) players
Place of birth missing (living people)
UAE First Division League players
UAE Pro League players
Association football goalkeepers